Criminal IQ Records is an independent record label based in Chicago, Illinois, founded by Jon Babbin (co-founder of Ruthless Records (Chicago)) and Darius Hurley to facilitate releases from Chicago's no-wave/punk scene that began in around 2003. Notable releases include garage pop-punk band M.O.T.O.'s LP Kill Moto, the Functional Blackouts S/T LP, and dark wave psyche punk band Vee Dee's Furthur LP.

Early releases were met with critical acclaim from underground music zines such as Maximumrocknroll and Horizontal Action, and more mainstream publications such as Arthur, Thrasher, Kerrang!, and Concussion Magazine. The records received airplay and occasionally topped charts on college radio stations around the country, as well as getting airplay on the BBC via the late John Peel Show. Criminal IQ later signed The Krunchies and all-female band The Manhandlers. The Manhandlers' compilation album Maybe Chicago? was co-released with Proto-Mersh Records, and featured original sound recordings by the Ponys, the Baseball Fury, the Tyrades, Twat Vibe, White Outs, Busy Kids, and the Hot Machines.

In 2006, Criminal IQ relinquished its Chicago-only policy and released singles by Texas hardcore band Army of Jesus, Milwaukee's Bear Proof Suit, Green Bay, and Portuguese punk band The Youths.

Discography 
Phenoms/Mushuganas - split 7-inch May 2003
M.O.T.O. (aka Masters of the Obvious) - Kill Moto CD/LP (LP co-released with Little Teddy Recordings of Germany) Jun 2003
Digital Sampler - 3" CD Comp
Functional Blackouts - S/T LP Oct 2003
Functional Blackouts - S/T CD Jan 2004
Maybe Chicago? - V/A Compilation CD Jan 2004
The Krunchies - Interrobang 7-inch EP Mar 2004
Vee Dee - Furthur LP/CD 2004
The Manhandlers - S/T LP/CD 2004
M.O.T.O. - Single File CD 2004
The Krunchies - In De Winkel CD/LP 2005
Rotten Fruits - A Bomb In The Nation 7-inch EP 2005
M.O.T.O. - Raw Power CD/LP 2005
I Attack - American Dream 7-inch EP 2005
The Pedestrians - Future Shock CD 2005
The Functional Blackouts - The Severed Tongue Speaks For Everyone LP 2006
Army of Jesus - Book Bomb 7-inch EP 2006
Bear Proof Suit - Science is Dead 7-inch EP 2006
The Gravetones - Dig It! CD 2006
The Youths - 7-inch EP 2007
Out With A Bang - Few Beers Left But Out of Drugs 7-inch EP 2007
The Effigies - Reside LP 2007
Terrible Twos - S/T LP 2008
 The Runs - 7-inch
The Effigies - “…on the move, or in danger (stop) This will have been my life (stop)” EP (digital release) 2009
 Useless Children - 7-inch 2010
 Catburglars - S/T LP 2010
 Claw Toe - Ingrown Ego 2009
 Claw Toe - S/T 12-inch EP 2012

See also 
 List of record labels
 Chicago Record Labels

References

External links
 Official site

American independent record labels
Punk record labels
Companies based in Chicago